Ingrid Hartmann (23 July 1930 – 9 November 2006) was a German sprint canoer who competed in the late 1950s and early 1960s. She was born in Bad Salzuflen, Free State of Lippe. She won the K-2 500 m silver medal at the 1960 Summer Olympics in Rome. Hartmann also won two medals at the ICF Canoe Sprint World Championships with a silver (K-4 500 m: 1963) and a bronze (K-2 500 m: 1958).

References

Ingrid Hartmann's profile at Sports Reference.com

1930 births
2006 deaths
People from Bad Salzuflen
Sportspeople from Detmold (region)
Canoeists at the 1960 Summer Olympics
German female canoeists
People from the Free State of Lippe
Olympic canoeists of the United Team of Germany
Olympic silver medalists for the United Team of Germany
Olympic medalists in canoeing
ICF Canoe Sprint World Championships medalists in kayak
Medalists at the 1960 Summer Olympics